MB3 may refer to:

 MB 3, a dwarf galaxy
 Thomas-Morse MB-3, biplane
 Moonbase 3, a British science fiction television programme in 1973
 MB3, mountain bike model manufactured by Bridgestone
 MB3, Molecular Biology, Biochemistry and Bioinformatics, Towson University Jess and Mildred Fisher College of Science and Mathematics 
 MB3-number (e.g. MB3-214, MB3-529, etc.), any of several Microsoft#Business Division exams